Gravel Island is an island in Lake Michigan. It is located in Ellison Bay, in the town of Liberty Grove, Wisconsin. The Gravel Island National Wildlife Refuge is made up of Gravel Island, and nearby Spider Island. The island is uninhabited, and a botanist who visited in 1999 was unable to find any vascular plants on the island.

In 2022, a large number of dead Caspian terns were found on Gravel Island, which were part of a larger die-off on Lake Michigan islands due to avian influenza.

Native American name 
A Native American name for the island is Mah-ko-me-ne-shine-me-nis or "Bear Island". A legend published in the early 1900s relates an incident four hundred years prior where a spirit bear was seen crossing the lake from the east shore. The Potawatomi beckoned him ashore. Since then they call the island Old Bear Cub island.

Climate

References

External links 
 Gravel Island, Web-Map of Door County, Wisconsin

Islands of Door County, Wisconsin
Lake islands of Wisconsin
Islands of Lake Michigan in Wisconsin
Uninhabited islands of Wisconsin